Adios Harry, (1951-1982), was a racehorse born to Adios and Helen Win. In 1955, Harry, ridden by Luther Lyons, ran a "miracle mile" in 1:55, a record that stood for 18 years and was considered one of the greatest performances by any harness horse. In total he shattered the mile standard five times at New York's Vernon Downs.  By the time he was five, Harry held twelve world pacing records. He was featured on the front cover of the July 23, 1956, issue of Sports Illustrated magazine, under the banner, "ADIOS HARRY: World's Fastest Pacer." The magazine dubbed him "Harry the Horrid".

In 2002 he was inducted into the Harness Racing Museum.

References

Horses in the United States
American Standardbred racehorses
1951 racehorse births
1982 racehorse deaths